The 2014 Big League World Series took place from July 23–30 in Easley, South Carolina, United States. Clearwater, Florida defeated Guayama, Puerto Rico in the championship game.

Teams

Results

United States Group

International Group

Elimination Round

References

Big League World Series
Big League World Series